Street Scenes 1970 is an American documentary film made by the New York Cinetracts Collective, most notable for its involvement of filmmaker Martin Scorsese, who served as production supervisor and post-production director on the film. It documents two protest rallies against the Vietnam War that took place in May 1970: the Hard Hat Riot on Wall Street in New York City and Kent State/Cambodia Incursion Protest in Washington, D.C. The numerous camera operators do impromptu interviews with the protesters and the spectators. The New York protest turns violent as protesters were attacked by construction workers who supported the war. The Washington protest is peaceful. At the end, Scorsese, Harvey Keitel, Jay Cocks and Verna Bloom discuss the events and the current state of world affairs. Oliver Stone was one of the many camera operators.

See also
 List of American films of 1970

References

External links
New York Times review
 

1970 films
Protests against the Vietnam War
Documentary films about the Vietnam War
American documentary films
1970 documentary films
1970s English-language films
1970s American films